Cahuenga may refer to:
 Campo de Cahuenga, California
 Cahuenga, California
 Cahuenga Boulevard, California
 Cahuenga Branch, California
 Cahuenga Pass, California
 Cahuenga Peak, California
 Rancho Cahuenga, California